John Carroll Leon Whitbeck Jr. is an American attorney and Republican Party official from Loudoun County, Virginia. Whitbeck was the chairman of the Republican Party of Virginia from 2015 to 2018.

Early life 
Whitbeck is originally from California. He attended Occidental College where he played football as a center and earned a degree in politics. He obtained his J.D. degree from the George Mason University School of Law.

Career 
Whitbeck is the managing partner of the law firm WhitbeckBennett, a family law practice based in Leesburg, Virginia. He was an adjunct professor at George Mason Law School and also previously served as a substitute judge in District Court for five years. Whitbeck unsuccessfully ran for a seat in the Virginia House of Delegates in 2011 elections.

In 2013, he was the chairman of the Republican committee for the 10th congressional district when he was nominated by his party to run in the 2014 State Senate special elections for the 33rd district. He lost the election to Jennifer Wexton. In January 2015, he was elected chairman of the Republican Party of Virginia to succeed Pat Mullins.
 
Following the primary elections for the 2018 Senate election in Virginia, Whitbeck announced his resignation from the chairmanship of the Republican Party of Virginia.

In January 2019, Whitbeck announced that he would seek the office of Loudoun County Chair. Whitbeck lost the election for Loudoun Chair in November to Phyllis Randall.

Electoral history

References 

People from California
Living people
Occidental College alumni
Antonin Scalia Law School alumni
Republican Party of Virginia chairs
21st-century American lawyers
Virginia Republicans
Year of birth missing (living people)
People from Leesburg, Virginia